A viperfish is any species of marine fish in the genus Chauliodus. Viperfishes are mostly found in the mesopelagic zone and are characterized by long, needle-like teeth and hinged lower jaws. Viperfishes undergo diel vertical migration and are found all around the world in tropical and temperate oceans. Viperfishes possess photophores along the ventral side of their body, likely used to camouflage them by blending in with the less than 1% of light that reaches to below 200 meters depth.

Although it may appear to be covered in scales, viperfishes do not possess scales. Rather, they are covered by a thick, transparent coating of unknown substance. Extremely large, fang-like teeth give the fish a slightly protruded lower jaw.

Habitat 
Viperfishes live in meso- and bathypelagic environments and have been found dominating submarine calderas such as the Kurose Hole, which is the site with the highest Chauliodus density known in the world. Viperfishes also engage in diel vertical migration, meaning they migrate up into more productive waters during the night to feed.  However, it is likely that only part of the total population of viperfishes engages in diel vertical migration in any given night, which could be due to their slow metabolism, i.e. they likely do not have to feed every night.

Feeding 
Viperfishes, depending on the species, prey on other pelagic fishes and crustaceans. Stomach contents of captured individuals have contained lanternfishes, bristlemouths, copepods and krill.

Species 

There are currently nine extant recognized species in this genus:
 Chauliodus barbatus Garman, 1899
 Chauliodus danae Regan & Trewavas, 1929 (Dana viperfish)
 Chauliodus dentatus Garman, 1899
 Chauliodus macouni T. H. Bean, 1890 (pacific viperfish)
 Chauliodus minimus Parin & Novikova, 1974
 Chauliodus pammelas Alcock, 1892
 Chauliodus schmidti Ege, 1948
 Chauliodus sloani Bloch & J. G. Schneider, 1801 (Sloane's viperfish)
 Chauliodus vasnetzovi Novikova, 1972

At least two more species are recognized from Late Miocene-aged fossils:
 Chauliodus eximus, (Jordan, 1925), originally Eostomias eximus, from Late Miocene California
 Chauliodus testa, Nazarkin, 2014, from the Late Miocene of Western Sakhalin Island

See also 
 Bathypelagic fish
 Deep-sea fish
 Mesopelagic zone

References 

Chauliodus
Extant Miocene first appearances
Taxa named by Marcus Elieser Bloch